Ananda Shankar (11 December 1942 – 26 March 1999) was an Indian musician, singer, and composer best known for fusing Western and Eastern musical styles. He was married to dancer and choreographer Tanusree Shankar.

Life
Born in Almora in Uttar Pradesh(now in Uttarakhand), India, Shankar was the son of Amala Shankar and Uday Shankar, popular dancers, and also the nephew of sitar player Ravi Shankar. He studied in The Scindia School, Gwalior. Ananda did not learn sitar from his uncle but studied instead with Lalmani Misra at Banaras Hindu University. He died in Kolkata on 26 March 1999 aged 56 from cardiac failure.

Professional career

In the late 1960s, Shankar travelled to Los Angeles, where he played with many contemporary musicians including Jimi Hendrix. There he was signed to Reprise Records and released his first album, Ananda Shankar, in 1970, with original Indian classical material alongside sitar-based cover versions of popular hits, The Rolling Stones' "Jumpin' Jack Flash" and The Doors' "Light My Fire".  The album is included in the book 1001 Albums You Must Hear Before You Die.

Returning to India in the early 1970s, Shankar continued to experiment musically and in 1975 released his most critically acclaimed album, Ananda Shankar and His Music, a jazz-funk mix of Eastern sitar, Western rock guitar, tabla and mridangam, drums and Moog synthesizers. Out of print for many years, the album was re-released on CD in 2005.

After working in India during the late 1970s and 1980s, Shankar's profile in the West began to rise again in the mid-1990s as his music found its way into club DJ sets, particularly in London. His music was brought to a wider audience with the release of Blue Note Records' 1996 rare groove compilation album, Blue Juice Vol. 1., including two tracks from Ananda Shankar and His Music, "Dancing Drums" and "Streets of Calcutta".

In the late 1990s, Shankar worked and toured in the United Kingdom with the London DJ State of Bengal and others, a collaboration that resulted in the Walking On album, featuring Shankar's trademark sitar soundscapes mixed with breakbeat and hip hop. Walking On was released in 2000 after Shankar's death the previous year.

In 2005 his music was said to be a major inspiration to the DJ duo Amorphous Androgynous / The Future Sound of London on their live show on BBC 6Mix called A Monstrous Psychedelic Bubble Exploding in Your Mind vol. 7

In 2010 and 2011, his music appeared in the following episodes of the NBC comedy show Outsourced:

In 2015, his cover of "Jumpin' Jack Flash" was featured in an episode of Master of None.

Discography
 Ananda Shankar, 1970 (LP, Reprise 6398; CD, Collectors' Choice CCM-545)
 Ananda Shankar and His Music, 1975 (EMI India)
 India Remembers Elvis, 1977 (EP, EMI India S/7EPE. 3201)
 Missing You, 1977 (EMI India)
 A Musical Discovery of India, 1978 (EMI India)
 Sa-Re-Ga Machan, 1981 (EMI India)
 2001, 1984 (EMI India)
 Temptations, 1992 (Gramaphone Company of India)
 Ananda Shankar: Shubh – The Auspicious, 1995
 Ananda, 1999 (EMI India)
 Arpan, 2000 (EMI India)
 Walking On, 2000 (Real World 48118-2, with State of Bengal)
 Ananda Shankar: A Life in Music – The Best of the EMI Years, 2005 (Times Square TSQ-CD-9052)
 Tamil film music from the film Yaaro Ezhudhiya KavidhaiYear : 1986

References

External links

1942 births
1999 deaths
Hindustani instrumentalists
People from Almora
Real World Records artists
Scindia School alumni
Musicians from Varanasi
Best Music Direction National Film Award winners
Indian film score composers
World music musicians
Bengali musicians
20th-century Indian composers
Indian male film score composers
20th-century male musicians